Albesa is a municipality in the  comarca of Noguera, in the province of Lleida, Catalonia, Spain.

In 1003 it was the seat of the battle of Albesa. The economy is mostly based on agriculture (fruit, potato, tomato), taking advantage of the presence of an acequia.
Sights include the parish church of St. Mary (18th century), with a 14th-century retablo, and the remains of the ancient castle (conquered by the Christians in 1098) and of several ancient Roman villas.

Notable natives
Ignasi Segarra i Banyeres, priest of Opus Dei prelature.
Fermí Palau i Casellas, teacher, politician and poet.

References

External links

 
 Government data pages 

Municipalities in Noguera (comarca)
Populated places in Noguera (comarca)